Van Dessel may refer to

Surnames

Kevin Van Dessel (born 1979), Belgian footballer
Romeo Van Dessel (born 1989), Belgian footballer
Wout Van Dessel (born 1974), Belgian DJ, member of Sylver

Businesses
Van Dessel Sports - Bicycle brand based in Mendham, New Jersey.